Sooryan is a 1982 Indian Malayalam film, directed by J. Sasikumar and produced by Babu. The film stars Ajayan, Sukumaran, Jalaja and M. G. Soman in the lead roles. The film has musical score by Johnson.

Cast
 
 Meena
Ajayan (Brother of Late action super star Jayan)
Sukumaran as Gopinadhan Nair
Jalaja as  Leela
M. G. Soman as Venu
Nellikode Bhaskaran
Poornima Jayaram as Ammini 
KPAC Sunny as Jailer
Sankaradi as A. R. C. Menon
 Ravikumar
 Manavalan Joseph
  Vijay babu

Soundtrack
The music was composed by Johnson and the lyrics were written by Kavalam Narayana Panicker.

References

External links
 

1982 films
1980s Malayalam-language films
Films directed by J. Sasikumar